The Qatar national rugby sevens team is a minor national sevens side. They competed at the 2017 Asia Rugby Sevens Series in the Trophy Division.

Asian Games

2006 Asian Games
Group C matches -

December 10

References

Rugby union in Qatar
S
National rugby sevens teams